Grover is a surname found with people in India as well as with people of English ancestry. The two names, however, are distinct in formation and share no common origins. In India, Grover is a clan among Punjabi Khatris and is the anglicized version of "Guruwara". The Grovers were concentrated in Jhang, Multan, Mianwali, Lahore, Amritsar and Sialkot before the partition of India.

Notable people 
Notable individuals with the surname Grover include:

India 
 Arjun Dass Grover,  Indian ophthalmologist
 Ashneer Grover, Indian entrepreneur]
 Anand Grover, senior lawyer known for legal activism in Indian law relating to homosexuality and HIV
 Anil Grover, Indian molecular biologist
 B. R. Grover, Indian historian
 Eva Grover, Indian actress
 Gulshan Grover (born 1955), Indian actor
 Karan Singh Grover (born 1982), Indian actor
 Karan V Grover, Indian actor
 Lov Grover (born 1961), Indian-American computer scientist
 Manish Grover, Indian BJP politician
 Rajesh Kumar Grover, Indian oncologist and former director and chief executive officer of Delhi State Cancer Institute
 Ravi Grover (born 1949), Indian nuclear scientist and founding vice-chancellor of Homi Bhabha National Institute
 Sahaj Grover, Indian chess prodigy
 Shuchi Grover, Indian educator
 Sunil Grover (born 1977) Indian actor and comedian 
 Teji Grover,  Hindi poet, fiction writer, translator and painter
 Tim Grover, trainer of Michael Jordan
 Varun Grover, Indian  Information systems researcher, ranked among the top 3 in the world
 Varun Grover, a National Award-winning lyricist and writer
 Vinod Kumar Grover, former Secretary of the Ministry of External Affairs of India
 Vrinda Grover a lawyer, researcher, and human rights and women's rights activist

Outside India 

 A.D. Grover (1865–1927), American banjoist
 Antoni Grover (born 1980), Australian football league player
 Asa Grover (1818–1887), U.S. politician from Kentucky
 Cuvier Grover (1828–1885), U.S. Army officer
 Frank Grover, New Zealand politician
 Geoff Grover, Australian Rules footballer with St Kilda and Port Melbourne
 Henry Grover (1927–2005), U.S. politician from Texas
 Herbert J. Grover, American educator and politician
 James R. Grover Jr. (1919–2012), U.S. Republican politician
 Jim Grover (martial arts), instructor in World War II
 John Grover, various people
 John Grover (British Army officer) (1897 – 1979), British general
 John Grover (cricketer) (1915–1990), English cricketer
 John William Grover (1836–1892), civil engineer
 La Fayette Grover (1823–1911), U.S. politician
 Malcolm Henry Grover (1858–1945), British Indian Army general
 Martha Grover, American chemical engineer
 Montague Grover (1870–1943), Australian newspaper editor
 Ricky Grover (born 1961), British actor and comedian
 Ruth Dennis Grover (1912–2003), American painter and educator
 Thomas Grover (1807–1886), Mormon Pioneer
 William Grover-Williams (1903–1945), American car racer

References

Indian surnames
Occupational surnames
Surnames of English origin
English-language occupational surnames